UIF may refer to:

In Computing:
 Universal Image Format, a proprietary disk image format used by MagicISO
 A little known and rarely used computer file format used by WordPerfect
 UI Foundry

Other uses:
 Unidad de Inteligencia Financiera (Argentina), the intelligence agency of the Argentine Ministry of Economy
 Unidad de Inteligencia Financiera (Mexico), a financial investigative agency in Mexico
 Unión de Impresores de Filipinas, in the Philippines
 Union Interlinguiste de France, an organization that promotes Interlingua in France
 United Indoor Football, an indoor American football league
 University Islamic Financial, an American financial service company which provides home and commercial financing.
 United Islamic Front
 United Issarak Front
 Unemployment Insurance Fund, in South Africa.